NDC or ndc may refer to:
 IATA code for Nanded Airport, India

Education 
 National Defence College (disambiguation)
 NATO Defence College, Rome, Italy
 Notre Dame College, Dhaka, Bangladesh
 Notre Dame College, Mymensingh, Bangladesh

Government 
 National Defence Commission of North Korea
 National Development Council of India
 National Development Council of Taiwan
 National Dialogue Conference, for Yemeni crisis
 Nationally Determined Contribution, for climate action
 New Deal for Communities, UK

Healthcare 
 Former McKesson Corporation#NDC Health or NDC
 National drug code, US medication identifier

Politics 
 National Democratic Congress (Ghana), a political party in Ghana
 National Democratic Congress (Grenada), a political party in Grenada
 National Democratic Congress (Zambia), a political party in Zambia
 New Democrat Coalition, a group in the U.S. Democratic Party
 North District Council, the district council for the North District in Hong Kong

Other uses 
 National Development Complex, Pakistan
New Distribution Capability, a data exchange format for airlines by the IATA
 National Dual Contract in Welsh Rugby Union
Network Distribution Center of the United States Postal Service
 Nippon Decimal Classification, Japanese library classification
 Nduma Defense of Congo, a militia
 N.D.C., a 2002 single by Australian band Jebediah
 Norwegian Developers Conference (NDC) usually in the form "NDC {location}" e.g. "NDC { Melbourne }"